Deadly Heroes is a direct-to-video 1993 action film starring Michael Paré, Jan-Michael Vincent and Billy Drago. Its leading hero Brad Cartowski (Paré) is a former Navy SEAL who must save his kidnapped wife. Directed by Menahem Golan, Deadly Heroes is notable for being one of the last films released under Golan's 21st Century Film Corporation banner. The company went bankrupt shortly thereafter.

The filming obviously occurred on a small budget. The film's primary filming location was in Israel. To cut costs director Golan used many of the chase scenes from his 1991 release Killing Streets (also starring Paré). The film has a similar feel to Golan's earlier and more successful film The Delta Force (1986).

Deadly Heroes received mixed to mostly negative reviews, criticized for its sexism and apparent similarities to The Delta Force. Paré and Vincent's performances were also largely panned. The film was later featured in an episode of Cinema Insomnia.

Plot
The film starts with a footage of a group of terrorists modifying toy guns to a real gun which can easily pass through a metal detector at Athens Airport. When a kid named Paul Cartowski discovers that the  terrorist bring plastic guns, he soon wonders and tells his father who is also a former CIA and Navy SEAL, Brad Cartowski. Then a gunfight begins and Cartowski is injured during a pursuit when the terrorists take the airport bus. The terrorists kidnaps his wife and fly her on a hijacked plane to North Africa. Cartowski goes in pursuit, aided by another ex-SEAL, Cody Grant.

Cartowski soon finds the terrorists' hide-out but is captured. They tie him up, beat him brutally, humiliate him, and subject him to long electro-torture sessions before he manages to escape. He soon returns with reinforcements of a group of Navy SEAL team to rescue his wife. The group of Navy SEALs sneak in the house with their stealth abilities. Alya, the female terrorist is the first who gets killed. Then Patrick, one of the terrorist manage to shoot one of the SEAL in the leg but the SEAL survives and able to playing dead on Patrick then kills him via neck-breaking, The SEAL then continue his mission with his partner.

As Cartowski able to kill another terrorist, he and Cody then ambushes Carlos, the leader of the terrorist group. As Cody shoots Carlos in the head, Cartowki rescues his wife. The mission was a success without a SEAL dies.

As he got a permission from Pentagon, Cartowski manage to blow the terrorist's house with explosions the SEALs plant in the house shortly before the mission starts. The rest of the SEALs doing a small celebration of their success to bring the terrorist down and rescue Cartowski's wife. The film ends with a footage of Cartowski and his wife meets his mother and his son, then they starts to huge each other with happiness of the success of bringing Cartowski's wife back with small injury. The rest of the SEALs especially Cody watch happily when the Cartowki's family reunited successfully.

Cast

Production
The film was directed by Menahem Golan, who also developed its concept with screenwriter Damian Lee, under the  pseudonym Joseph Goldman. Lee produced Deadly Heroes and wrote its script with his brother Gregory. Many of the film's crew members were Israeli, including cinematographer Yelhiel-Hilik Neeman, art director Avishay "Avi" Avivi, and actors Alon Abutbul, Galit Giat and Uri Gavriel. The film was shot on a low budget, primarily in Israel but also in Los Angeles. It was meant to resemble Golan's earlier, more successful action film The Delta Force (1986). In order to save money, Golan ussed many of the chase scenes from his 1991 film Killing Streets — in both of them Michael Paré stars as a macho-type leading man. It is most apparent in the taxicab scene featuring actor Gabi Amrani, where the shots are identical in both films. Stock footage was also provided for Deadly Heroes.

Release
The film is notable for being one of the last titles released under Golan's 21st Century Film Corporation banner. The company went bankrupt shortly eafter its 1993 premiere. Deadly Heroes was first screened during the Milan Film Festival in October 1993. It was then released direct-to-video in Germany in October 1994, and premiered in Japanese theaters on November 26, 1994. It then premiered in Japan on video in March 1995. In Germany, the film was also distributed under the title Deadly Heroes – S.E.A.L.S. in tödlicher Mission, and in Poland it was released by VIM as Komandosi śmierci.

In Finland, the film was released on VHS as Tappavat sankarit in 1997. It was distributed direct-to-video in Canada (through C/FP Video, 1997), the Netherlands (Laurus Entertainment), Greece (Videosonic, 1997), and the United Kingdom (Delta Music, 2002). It aired on Telewizja Polska in Poland.

Availability

Originally intended for a theatrical release, the film was released directly to videocassette and was given only limited theatrical releases overseas and was screened at various film festivals, including a run at the 1993 MIFED Film Market. The movie has never been released on DVD in the United States and as of March 2019, MGM has yet to announce any current plans for a Region 1 DVD release.

Critical reception
The film received mixed to mostly negative reviews. TV Guide ridiculed the film, writing: "Underachieving stars Michael Paré and Jan-Michael Vincent try to infuse Deadly Heroes with rousing patriotism. But most of the time, they simply glower unflinchingly as if to compensate for the fruity overacting of Billy Drago, who plays the villain." The site's reviewer condemned the film's "irritating gung-ho patriotism and its lip-smacking preoccupation with Marcy's [Claudette Mink's character] abduction into white slavery". Schnittberichte.com praised Billy Drago as a "convincing villain" and Michael Paré as a decent leading hero. The Movies or Minute website wrote that "Deadly Heroes is chock full of idiotic moments of glee." Comeuppance Reviews provided a mixed evaluation, criticising Paré's "wooden" performance. Action cinema-related website Cool Target labeled the film as "a trashier remake of Menahem Golan's earlier hit The Delta Force", and Paré's character as sexist. Steve Q. of Zero Star Cinema agreed, considering the film "boilerplate 90's action schlock" and comparing it to The Delta Force. He criticized its plot inconsistencies, and added: "It's silly, but it keeps moving."

In the review for VHS Retro the film was praised for its "tacky but irresistible" opening. Drago's supporting role was also cheered but Paré and Jan-Michael Vincent were deemed to be "absent" and "bored" in their acting. The plot was branded as "nonsensical": "Brad, terribly beaten up and tortured by Carlos and his thugs, acts like he's at the peak of his powers soon after he escapes captivity." Marta Górna of Górna Ogląda considered Deadly Heroes to be a case study of the action star's downfall (in this context, Paré's and Vincent's). Albert Nowicki (Yippee-ki-yay, Motherf*cker!) thought that Vincent's Cody Grant was an "expendable" character and Paré gave a stiff, "wooden" performance. He noted that Paré's "marvelous physical form" is one of the film's advantages but "impressive musculature won't patch lack of charisma". Nowicki criticized Golan's direction, calling the film sexist and unintentionally funny, and thought that Paré's torture scene is "inadvertently erotic in its nature". Internet critic Raymond Smith called it "action film with no action".

Writing for Movie Buffs Forever, a reviewer applauded Paré, Vincent, Drago, and Galit Giat — who played the female torturer of Cartowski. He noted that the film "exciting" is and "starts off with a bang". BadMovies named Deadly Heroes "well-filmed action flick that could've been better if it was fifteen minutes shorter".

Legacy
The film was featured in the season one episode of Cinema Insomnia, which celebrates low quality cinema.

References

External links
 

1993 action films
1993 films
1993 direct-to-video films
American action films
Direct-to-video action films
Films about United States Navy SEALs
Films directed by Menahem Golan
Films set in Athens
Films set in North Africa
Films shot in Los Angeles
Films shot in Israel
Films with screenplays by Menahem Golan
Films about aircraft hijackings
Films about kidnapping
Films produced by Damian Lee
Films with screenplays by Damian Lee
1990s English-language films
1990s American films